is a Japanese ice sledge hockey goaltender. He was part of the Japanese sledge hockey team that won a silver medal at the 2010 Winter Paralympics. He competed at the 2018 Winter Olympics at age 61.

He became paralyzed following a motorcycle accident at age 24.

References

External links 
 

1956 births
Living people
Japanese sledge hockey players
Paralympic sledge hockey players of Japan
Paralympic silver medalists for Japan
Ice sledge hockey players at the 2002 Winter Paralympics
Ice sledge hockey players at the 2006 Winter Paralympics
Ice sledge hockey players at the 2010 Winter Paralympics
Para ice hockey players at the 2018 Winter Paralympics
Medalists at the 2010 Winter Paralympics
People from Fujieda, Shizuoka
Sportspeople from Shizuoka Prefecture
People with paraplegia
Paralympic medalists in sledge hockey